Chibchanomys is a genus of rodent in the family Cricetidae. It contains the following species:
 Las Cajas water mouse (Chibchanomys orcesi)
 Chibchan water mouse (Chibchanomys trichotis)

References

 
Rodent genera
Rodents of South America
Taxonomy articles created by Polbot